Zaliznychne is an urban-type settlement in Synelnykove Raion of Dnipropetrovsk Oblast in Ukraine. It belongs to Petropavlivka settlement hromada, one of the hromadas of Ukraine. Population: 

Until 2016, the settlement was known as Brahynivka. On 19 May 2016, Verkhovna Rada decided to rename Brahynivka to Zaliznychne according to the law prohibiting names of Communist origin.

Until 18 July 2020, Zaliznychne belonged to Petropavlivka Raion. The raion was abolished in July 2020 as part of the administrative reform of Ukraine, which reduced the number of raions of Dnipropetrovsk Oblast to seven. The area of Petropavlivka Raion was merged into Synelnykove Raion.

Economy

Transportation
The settlement has access to Highway M04 which connects Dnipro via Pavlohrad with Pokrovsk.

Petropavlivka railway station, on the railway connecting Pavlohrad and Pokrovsk, is located in Zaliznychne. There is infrequent passenger traffic.

References

Urban-type settlements in Synelnykove Raion